1301 may refer to

 1301, events in the year 1301 of the Gregorian calendar.
 1301 SH, a year in the Solar Hijri calendar (corresponding to 21 March 1922 – 20 March 1923 in the Gregorian calendar).

References